The Sifang Art Museum previously known as 4Cube Museum of Contemporary Art is a museum in Nanjing, in Jiangsu province in China. It is a non-profit private multi-functional institution dedicated to the exhibition, preservation, research and education of contemporary art and architecture. 
In 2013 it opened its new premises designed and built by American architect Steven Holl. The new premises feature a 3000-square metre flexible exhibition area, as well as a tea-house and a residency for the curator. It forms part of the Chinese International Practical Exhibition of Architecture (CIPEA).

References

External links
 Official website
 Nanjing Museum of Art and Architecture

Art museums and galleries in China
Museums in Nanjing
Modern art museums in China
Art museums established in 2010
Steven Holl buildings
Contemporary art galleries in China
2010 establishments in China